The second series of The Bill, a British television drama, consisted of twelve episodes, broadcast between 11 November 1985 and 10 February 1986. 

Many of the cast and crew shared their memories of making this second series for the book Witness Statements, including stars John Salthouse, Eric Richard, Trudie Goodwin, Mark Wingett, Peter Ellis, Nula Conwell, Jon Iles, Larry Dann, Colin Blumenau, Robert Hudson, Ashley Gunstock and Ralph Brown; along with writers Barry Appleton, Lionel Goldstein, Ginnie Hole and Christopher Russell, producer Peter Cregeen and directors Michael Ferguson and John Woods.

Cast changes

Arrivals
 PC Abe Lyttleton
 PC Pete Muswell
 PC Nick Shaw

Departures
 PC Abe Lyttleton
 PC Dave Litten
 PC Pete Muswell

Episodes

1985 British television seasons
1986 British television seasons
The Bill series